Barriguda tree is a common name for several plants and may refer to:

Acrocomia intumescens

Species in the genus Ceiba, specifically
Ceiba speciosa, native to South America
Ceiba ventricosa, native to Brazil
Iriartea ventricosa